This is a list of holidays in Morocco.

Public holidays

Movable holidays
The following holidays are public holidays but the date on which each occurs varies, according to its corresponding calendar, and thus has no set date. In order in which they occur:

References 

Morocco
Moroccan culture
Events in Morocco
Holidays
Morocco